1986 in professional wrestling describes the year's events in the world of professional wrestling.

List of notable promotions 
These promotions held notable shows in 1986.

Calendar of notable shows

Notable events
Benjamin Mora Jr. creates the World Wrestling Association (WWA) based out of Tijuana, Baja California, Mexico.

February 18 - World Class Championship Wrestling seceded from the National Wrestling Alliance

March - Bill Watts renames his Mid South Wrestling territory the Universal Wrestling Federation

August 30 - The final episodes of both WWF Championship Wrestling and WWF All Star Wrestling airs on syndication.

September 6 and 7 - WWF  debuted two new weekly shows WWF Superstars of Wrestling and WWF Wrestling Challenge on syndication replacing both WWF Championship Wrestling and WWF All Star Wrestling

September - WCCW debuts on ESPN

Tournaments and accomplishments

JCP

WWF

Slammy Awards

Awards and honors

Pro Wrestling Illustrated

Wrestling Observer Newsletter

Title changes

WWF

Births

 January 7 - Melanie Cruise
 January 14 - Matt Riddle 
 January 24 - Vinny Marseglia 
 February 5 – Madison Rayne
 February 17 - Ricardo Rodriguez 
 March 1 - Big E Langston
 March 4 - Dalton Castle 
 March 8 - Chad Gable
 March 16 - Kenny Dykstra
 March 27 - So Cal Val 
 March 28 - Mustafa Ali
 April 5 – Charlotte Flair
 April 19 - Maxine 
 April 22 - Chuck Taylor 
 April 23 – Jessie Godderz
 May 19 - Danny Havoc (died in 2020)
 May 28 – Seth Rollins
 May 29 – Hornswoggle
 June 15 - Cezar Bononi
 June 20:
Shadia Bseiso
Jessicka Havok
 June 24 - Jessamyn Duke 
 June 29 
 Serena
 Súper Nova
 June 30 – Alicia Fox
 July 17: 
Mojo Rawley
Lacey Von Erich 
 July 19 - Jinder Mahal
 July 22 - Thunder Rosa 
 August 6 - Reby Sky 
 August 16 - Big Cass
 August 22 - Neville
 September 4 - Xavier Woods
 September 7 – Colin Delaney
 October 5 - Joaquin Wilde 
 October 7 – Kaitlyn
 October 12 - Gregory Iron
 November 5 – Alexander Wolfe
 November 6 – Nick Aldis
 November 13 – Act Yasukawa
 November 14 - Kalisto
 November 25 - Karsten Beck (died in 2020) 
December 3 - Wolfgang
 December 8 - Enzo Amore

Debuts
Unknown date
John Laurinaitis
Norman Smiley
Cody Michaels
Brian Adams
Doug Gilbert
Paul Heyman
Scott Steiner
The Warlord
Charles Robinson
Luna Vachon
Emily Dole
Ursula Hayden
February 16 - Kensuke Sasaki
February 26 - Hiroshi Hase
April - Jeff Jarrett
May 30 - Owen Hart
August 8 - Kaoru Maeda
August 17 
Mayumi Ozaki
Dynamite Kansai
September 16 - Aja Kong
September 18 - Cutie Suzuki
October - Ron Simmons
December 1 - Road Dogg (Made his debut for only one appearance at 17 before he went into the marines. He returned to wrestling in 1991.)

Retirements
 Bobby Duncum Sr. (1967 - 1986)
 Don Kent (1956 - 1986)
 Dr. Wagner (July 16, 1961 - April 27, 1986)
 Dick the Bruiser (1954 - 1986)
 Ernie Ladd (1961 - 1986)
 Hubert Gallant (May 2, 1975 - 1986)
 Jacques Rougeau, Sr. (1956 - 1986)
 Kurt Von Hess (September 1968 - 1986)
 Lars Anderson (1965 - 1986)
 Mad Maxine (1984 - 1986)
 Mario Milano (1953 - 1986)
 Maurice Vachon (1950 - 1986)
 Pampero Firpo (1953 - 1986)
 Stu Hart (1943-July 25, 1986) 
 Swede Hanson (1957 - 1986)
 Vivian St. John (August 6, 1974 - 1986)
 Vivian Vachon (1969 - 1986)
 Don Fargo (1952 - 1986)

Deaths 
 February 2 – Gino Hernandez, 28
 March 25 - Warren Bockwinkel, 74
 April 6 – El Solitario, 39
 April 26 – Ángel Blanco, 47

See also
List of WCW pay-per-view events
List of WWF pay-per-view events

References

 
professional wrestling